Ten Little Aliens is a BBC Books original novel written by Stephen Cole and based on the long-running British science fiction television series Doctor Who. It features the First Doctor, Ben and Polly.

Ten Little Aliens was re-released in 2013 for the 50th Anniversary of Doctor Who.

Reception
In Interzone, Matt Hills writes, "The novel's major premise is sharply executed: the corpses of "most wanted" alien terrorists mysteriously return to life in order to attack an elite military squad sent to hunt them down. [...] Cole's plotting is strong, and the novel also hits home via its quirky stylistic choices: introducing military characters very economically through their comments on the Schirr enemy, and pausing for a "Make Your Own Adventure"-style interlude where one has to navigate through the different viewpoints of a neural network."

References

External links
The Cloister Library - Ten Little Aliens

2002 British novels
2002 science fiction novels
Past Doctor Adventures
First Doctor novels
Novels by Stephen Cole
BBC Books books